John-Charles Astle (born 30 August 1990) is a South African rugby union player for the  in the Pro14. His regular position is lock.

Career
He represented them at Under–19 level in 2009 and at Under–21 in 2010 and 2011.

In 2010, he was also included in their Vodacom Cup squad and he made his first class debut against . He made 16 appearances for them in the Vodacom Cup, but failed to break into their Currie Cup squad and subsequently joined the  prior to the 2013 Currie Cup First Division season.

He was released by the Sharks in November 2015.

He joined French Pro D2 side  during the 2016–17 season.

References

South African rugby union players
Living people
1990 births
Free State Cheetahs players
Boland Cavaliers players
Rugby union locks
People from Queenstown, South Africa
South African people of English descent
Southern Kings players
White South African people
Sharks (Currie Cup) players
Stade Montois players
Rouen Normandie Rugby players
Rugby union players from the Eastern Cape